Ħal Farruġ is a hamlet located in the south east of Malta, within the limits of Luqa. Within the hamlet's general area, a total number of 24 streets can be found.

The hamlet was run down in 1941 due to the construction of a new airport runway, which is today the major runway in the Malta International Airport.  

Ħal Farruġ hosts the headquarters of Polidano Group, Malta's largest construction company. As of Friday, September 2020, the Maltese Government transferred  to the Valletta F.C. to be used as a football pitch. 

A Covid-19 swab-test center was opened in March 2020. It is located on the outskirts of the hamlet.

References 

Luqa